Michael Francis Moore is a former judge who served on the Federal Court of Australia. He was also a judge of the Court of Appeal of Tonga.

References 

Judges of the Federal Court of Australia
Living people
Australian judges on the courts of Tonga
Court of Appeal of Tonga justices
Judges of the Industrial Relations Court of Australia
20th-century Australian judges
21st-century Australian judges
Year of birth missing (living people)